Mini Studio is a TV show for kids and preteens in the MENA. It was created by Ghazy Feghaly and first aired in 1992 on MTV. The show celebrated its 25th anniversary of being on air in 2016. The show's singularity holds in its 350 original characters, and its multilingual songs spanning French, English & Arabic. It spawned highly successful theatrical plays, tours, concerts, albums, DVDs, products and merchandize, entertaining and educating children across all borders.

Notable characters & songs
Kikky (Marie-Christine Naim) is the show's lead since its very beginning. She's often compared to Chantal Goya, or Dorothee. She's accompanied by many characters including Glagla Le Clown, Woonie Le Marin, Sucette, Papouf, Mamouf, Patitoupata, Fanfan L'Elephant, and the show's original witch Ambrosia plus her crow Cornefer. All character names and songs were conceived and composed by Ghazy Feghaly. He drew inspiration from his niece's Youmna Chamcham imaginary friends. They wrote many of the songs while playing together at home. Monsieur Le Livre, once Youmna's lullaby, is now a song taught in nurseries and schools. Mini Studio was the first show to ever record the Alphabet Song in Arabic in 1996. Every year the show releases a new album and a Holiday special for Christmas & Easter.

Musical theater 
Every year, Mini Studio produced one original Musical Theater bridging their TV characters and storylines to make fantasy worlds come to life onstage. They attracted audiences of 60,000 a year. Ghazy Feghaly wrote and directed a total of 22 original plays. Most of the content was originally in French. English and Arabic began to be introduced in 2000, when the show started being broadcast across the world through satellite TV and the internet.
A la recherche de l'étoile perdue (1992)
Voyage au pays d'Amareddine (1993)
La légende du fantôme prisonnier (1995)
Le secret de Chiffon La Poupée (1996)
Pierrot au pays des chansons (1997)
Les pirates de l'île aux bonbons (1998)
Kikky et le Père Noël (1999)
Oursoudoux City (1999)
Cartoon Town (2000)
Happy Birthday Lou (2001)
Christmas Wonderland (2002)
Summer Camp (2002)
It's Christmas (2003)
Le secret de Chiffon La Poupée (2003)
Mini Studio Forever (2003)
Bonjour l'école (2005)
Easter in Bonny Bunny Land (2008)
L'étoile de Fifi (2008)
Les Aventures de Peter Cottontail (2009)
Hey! Ambrosia it's Christmas (2009)
J'ai perdu le Do (2010)
Hikayat Amareddine (2011)

Album releases
Since 1995, Mini Studio issued one album per year, so children could bring their favorite new songs and characters home. The albums were sold at the musical theater performances, while on tour, as well as at Virgin Megastore.

External links
 http://ministudioclub.tv

Lebanese television series
1990s Lebanese television series
2000s Lebanese television series
2010s Lebanese television series
1990s children's television series
2000s children's television series
2010s children's television series
MTV (Lebanon) original programming